Liberia competed at the 1988 Summer Olympics in Seoul, South Korea. They had a very poor showing, despite their magnificent send-off. Two members of the official delegation were assaulted upon their return because of the perceived embarrassment suffered by the nation at their expense.

Competitors
The following is the list of number of competitors in the Games.

References

Official Olympic Reports

Nations at the 1988 Summer Olympics
1988
Oly